Opsarius tileo is a fish in genus Opsarius of the family Cyprinidae which is found in India, Bangladesh and Nepal, and probably Myanmar.

References 

Opsarius
Fish described in 1822